Moin Mumtaz (born 24 June 1964) was a Pakistani cricketer who played over a period from 1981 to 2001.

British career 

Moin moved to the UK in 1987 and played 14 years in the Highway Club in Coventry.  He successfully led the team to numerous victories including winning the pick of the league many years in a row.

References 
 

1964 births
Living people
Pakistan Automobiles Corporation cricketers
Pakistani cricketers
Cricketers from Karachi
Karachi Greens cricketers
Karachi cricketers
Karachi Blues cricketers